The Ain Zada Dam is an embankment dam located  east of Khelil on the Bou-Sellam River in Bordj Bou Arréridj Province, Algeria.

References

Dams in Algeria
Embankment dams
Buildings and structures in Bordj Bou Arréridj Province
Dams completed in 1986
1986 establishments in Algeria
Geography of Bordj Bou Arréridj Province
Bodies of water of Algeria